The Biloxi Shuckers are a Minor League Baseball team of the Southern League and the Double-A affiliate of the Milwaukee Brewers. They are located in Biloxi, Mississippi, and are named in reference to the city's oyster industry and seafood heritage. The Shuckers play their home games at MGM Park.

The team began play in 2015 after the Southern League's Huntsville Stars relocated to Biloxi following the 2014 season. With Major League Baseball's restructuring of Minor League Baseball in 2021, the Shuckers were placed in the Double-A South, which became the Southern League in 2022.

Biloxi has played in three Southern League championship series but has not won a league title. As of the completion of the 2022 season, the Shuckers have played 941 regular season games and compiled a win–loss record of 496–445. They have a postseason record of 14–12. Combining all 967 regular-season and postseason games, Biloxi has an all-time record of 510–401.

History

Before Biloxi
Before the arrival of the Shuckers, the only other professional baseball team from Biloxi, Mississippi, was the Gulfport-Biloxi Sand Crabs, who played in the Class C Cotton States League in 1907. The Shuckers came to the city 108 years later by way of Nashville, Tennessee, and Huntsville, Alabama. In 1978, the Nashville Sounds began play as an expansion team of the Double-A Southern League. In 1984, Sounds president Larry Schmittou and other members of the team's ownership group purchased the Evansville Triplets of the Triple-A American Association with plans to move the team from Evansville, Indiana, to Nashville for the 1985 season. The Southern League wanted Schmittou to surrender his franchise to the league, but he had plans to relocate the Double-A team instead. After a move to Evansville was denied, the City of Huntsville agreed to build a new ballpark, Joe W. Davis Stadium, which lured the franchise to town where it began play as the Huntsville Stars in 1985.

Twenty-nine years later, following several failed attempts to replace Huntsville's aging ballpark, the Stars were sold to Biloxi Baseball, under the leadership of majority owner Ken Young, in January 2014. Previous owner Miles Prentice and other shareholders retained a minority stake in the team. The franchise remained in Huntsville until the end of the 2014 season while a new ballpark could be constructed in Biloxi.

Milwaukee Brewers (2015–present)

The relocated Biloxi team continued to compete in the Double-A Southern League as an affiliate of the Milwaukee Brewers Major League Baseball (MLB) team, continuing the relationship between Milwaukee and Huntsville that had been in place since 1999. The club's new moniker was selected by fans in a name-the-team contest. Among the finalists were "Shrimpers", "Black Jacks", "Beacon", "Mullets", and "Schooners". The chosen name, "Biloxi Shuckers", celebrates the city's heritage as a center for the oyster and seafood industries. Their primary logo utilizes a color palette of gulf blue, sand, coral, and black and features an open oyster with a pair of eyes along with the team name.

Due to construction delays at Biloxi's 6,000-seat MGM Park in Biloxi, the Shuckers played the first 54 games of their inaugural 2015 season on the road. These included several games originally planned to be held in Biloxi for which the Shuckers were designated the "home" team in their opponents' ballparks. Fifteen games were played at Joe W. Davis Stadium in Huntsville, but under the Shuckers name, not that of the old Stars.

The Shuckers played their first game on April 9, 2015, against the Pensacola Blue Wahoos at Admiral Fetterman Field in Pensacola, Florida, which they won, 4–0. Orlando Arcia led the scoring with three runs batted in, while the Shuckers' pitching staff held their opponents to three hits and struck out nine batters. The team's MGM Park home opener was played on June 6 versus the Mobile BayBears, a 4–3 victory. Going into extra innings, Nick Shaw singled home Brent Suter from second base in the bottom of the fourteenth inning to secure the win. The inaugural home opener was attended by 5,065 people.

The Southern League uses a split-season schedule wherein the division winners from each half qualify for the postseason championship playoffs. Biloxi won the First Half South Division title, earning them a berth in the postseason. In the best-of-five division series, they defeated second-half winners Pensacola, 3–0, to win the South Division title and advance to the championship finals. There, they lost to the Chattanooga Lookouts, 3–2, in a series that went the full five games. Overall, the Shuckers finished their first season with a league-best 78–59 record. Jorge López won the Southern League Most Outstanding Pitcher Award with a league-leading 1.10 WHIP and a .205 opponents' batting average while tying for the lead with 12 wins. Manager Carlos Subero was selected as the Southern League Manager of the Year.

On April 2, 2016, the Shuckers hosted an exhibition game against the Milwaukee Brewers, a 7–4 loss attended by 5,152 people. Brewers appearing in the game included Ryan Braun, Domingo Santana, Jonathan Villar, Martín Maldonado, and Chase Anderson. This was the first time a major league team played in Biloxi since the 1938 Philadelphia Phillies held spring training at Biloxi Stadium. Under manager Mike Guerrero, the 2016 Shuckers finished with a 72–67 record but did not win either half of the season. 

Shuckers pitchers threw the first no-hitter in franchise history on August 14, 2017. Hiram Burgos (2 IP), Forrest Snow (3 IP), Nick Ramirez (1 IP), and Jorge López (1 IP) combined for the effort in the second game of a seven-inning doubleheader against the Tennessee Smokies at MGM Park, a 1–0 win. The team missed the postseason with a 71–66 campaign.

Biloxi won both the First and Second Half South Division titles in 2018 on the way to a league-best 81–59 record. They beat Pensacola, 3–1, to win the South Division title before being defeated in the finals by the Jackson Generals, 3–1. Though the team was denied their first league championship, they swept the major Southern League awards that season, winning all three. Southern League Most Valuable Player Corey Ray led the league in home runs (27), stolen bases (35), and doubles (32) at the time of his selection. Zack Brown won the Most Outstanding Pitcher Award after leading the circuit with a 2.48 earned run average. Third-year manager Mike Guerrero rounded out the honors, winning Manager of the Year.

The Shuckers hosted the Southern League All-Star Game at MGM Park on June 18, 2019. The North Division All-Stars defeated the South Division All-Stars, 7–3, with 4,209 people on hand. Luis Robert of the Birmingham Barons was selected as the game's Most Valuable Player. Jeffrey Baez of the Jackson Generals won the previous day's Home Run Derby.

Like the previous season, Guerrero led the 2019 Shuckers to win both halves of the season with an overall record of 82–57, second overall in the league. They bested Pensacola, 3–2, for the South Division title, but they were again defeated by Jackson in the finals, 3–2. Trey Supak, who led the Southern League with 11 wins, a 0.87 WHIP, and a .192 opponents' batting average at the time of his July 26 promotion to the Triple-A San Antonio Missions, was selected as the league's Most Outstanding Pitcher.

The start of the 2020 season was postponed due to the COVID-19 pandemic before being cancelled on June 30. Following the 2020 season, Major League Baseball assumed control of Minor League Baseball in a move to increase player salaries, modernize facility standards, and reduce travel. As a result, the Southern League disbanded and the Shuckers were placed in the Double-A South. Biloxi's 2021 opener in the new league, scheduled for May 4 on the road versus the Birmingham Barons at Regions Field, was postponed due to inclement weather. The game was made up the next evening as part of a doubleheader, both games of which the Shuckers lost, 6–1 and 2–1. On May 15, pitchers Ethan Small (5 IP), Zach Vennaro (1 IP), Nathan Kirby (2 IP), and Matt Hardy (1 IP) tossed a combined no-hitter against the Mississippi Braves in a 1–0 win at MGM Park. They ended the season in fourth place in the Southern Division at 45–69.

In 2022, the Double-A South became known as the Southern League, the name historically used by the regional circuit prior to the 2021 reorganization. The Shuckers finished the first half of the season in second place, two-and-a-half games behind the division winner. They placed further back in the second half, and posted an overall record of 67–68. Catcher Jakson Reetz was chosen for the Southern League MVP Award. As of the completion of the 2022 season, the Shuckers have played 941 regular season games and compiled a win–loss record of 496–445. They have a postseason record of 14–12. Combining all 967 regular-season and postseason games, Biloxi has an all-time record of 510–401.

In February 2023, Ken Young, the managing partner of Biloxi Baseball, sold the franchise to Shuckers Baseball, which is owned and operated by John Tracy.

Season-by-season records

Radio and television 
All home and road games are broadcast on WGCM AM 1240 (100.9 FM) and across the Biloxi Shuckers Radio Network. Live audio broadcasts are also available online through the team's website and the MiLB First Pitch and TuneIn radio apps. All home and road games can be viewed through the MiLB.TV subscription feature of the official website of Minor League Baseball, with audio provided by a radio simulcast. Garrett Greene has been the primary play-by-play broadcaster since 2018.

Mascot 

The Shuckers' mascot is an anthropomorphic seagull named Schooner. He is gray with a white neck and has blue feathers around his eyes and a yellow beak and legs. Schooner wears the same blue jerseys as the team with the number one and blue and white sneakers. He made his debut on April 2, 2016, during an exhibition game against the Milwaukee Brewers prior to the Shuckers' first full season at MGM Park.

Roster

Achievements

Awards

Five players, two managers, and one executives have won Southern League awards in recognition for their performance with the Shuckers.

Postseason All-Stars

Nine players have been named to the Southern League Postseason All-Star Team. Nate Griep is the only Shucker to be selected twice.

References

Specific

General

External links
 
 Statistics from Baseball-Reference

2015 establishments in Mississippi
Baseball teams established in 2015
Double-A South teams
Milwaukee Brewers minor league affiliates
Professional baseball teams in Mississippi
Southern League (1964–present) teams
Sports in Biloxi, Mississippi